Wahrheit oder Pflicht (German for "Truth or Dare") is the eighth studio album by the German rock band Oomph!, released in February 2004. It is the band's most commercially successful album, being their only title to achieve platinum status in Germany so far.

Track listing
 Augen auf! ("Eyes Open") - 3:20
 Tausend neue Lügen ("Thousand New Lies") - 3:56
 Wenn du weinst ("When You Cry") - 4:32
 Sex hat keine Macht ("Sex Has No Meaning") - 4:18
 Burn Your Eyes - 4:10 (Limited Edition Bonus Track)
 Brennende Liebe (featuring L’âme Immortelle) ("Burning Love") - 3:48 (New Edition Bonus Track)
 Dein Weg ("Your Way") - 3:28
 Du spielst Gott ("You Play God") - 4:16
 Dein Feuer ("Your Fire") - 3:48
 Answer Me - 4:13 (Limited Edition Bonus Track)
 Eisbär ("Polar Bear") - 4:17 (New Edition Bonus Track)
 Der Strom ("The Stream") - 3:03
 Nichts (ist kälter als deine Liebe) ("Nothing (Is Colder Than Your Love)") - 4:13
 Nothing - 4:56 (Limited Edition Bonus Track)
 Diesmal wirst du sehen ("This Time, You Will See") - 4:02
 Tief in dir ("Deep In You") - 4:13
 I'm Going Down - 4:33
 Im Licht ("In the Light") - 4:09
 *"Augen auf" translates literally as "Eyes Open", but the way it is used in the song ("Augen auf, ich komme"), is in the sense of a game ("Ready or not, here I come", from the game of hide-and-seek).
 *The Limited and New editions had "I'm Going Down" as a hidden track, found after "Im Licht" (there is a two-minute intermission of silence).

Personnel
Oomph!
Dero Goi – lead vocals, drums
Andreas Crap – guitars and keyboards
Robert Flux – samples and guitars

Charts

Weekly charts

Year-end charts

References

See also
 Truth or Dare

Oomph! albums
2004 albums
German-language albums